The 1916 South American Championship was the first continental championship for national association football teams in South America. It was held in Buenos Aires, Argentina from 2 to 17 July during Argentina's Independence Centenary commemorations. The tournament was won by Uruguay, who drew with Argentina in the last match of the tournament at Racing Club Stadium.

Squads

For a complete list of participating squads see: 1916 South American Championship squads

Format
There was no qualifying for the tournament. The participating countries were Argentina, Brazil, Chile and Uruguay. The teams played a single round-robin tournament, earning two points for a win, one point for a draw, and zero points for a loss.

Venues

Final round
Each team played one match against each of the other teams. Two points were awarded for a win, one point for a draw and zero points for a defeat.

Goalscorers

Notes

References

 
1916
1916
1
1916 in Argentine football
1916 in Brazilian football
1916 in Uruguayan football
1916 in Chilean sport
1916
July 1916 sports events
Sport in Avellaneda
1916
1910s in Buenos Aires